Christopher Centrone (born 24 July 1991) is an Italy international rugby league footballer who  plays as a  and  for Toulouse Olympique in the Betfred Championship.

Background
Born in Newcastle, New South Wales, Centrone is of Italian descent. He played his junior rugby league for the Nelson Bay Marlins before being signed by the Canterbury-Bankstown Bulldogs.

Playing career
In 2010 and 2011, Centrone played for the Canterbury-Bankstown Bulldogs' NYC team.

In 2012, Centrone joined the North Sydney Bears in the New South Wales Cup. In 2013, after impressing for North Sydney, Centrone was signed by the South Sydney Rabbitohs.

At the end of 2013, Centrone was named in Italy's 2013 World Cup squad. He scored a try in Italy's first game of the tournament against Wales.

In 2014, Centrone joined the Wyong Roos in the New South Wales Cup.

In 2016, Centrone represented Italy at the 2017 World Cup qualifiers, scoring a try against Russia. In 2017, Centrone was a member of Italy's 2017 World Cup squad.

In May 2018, Centrone left Wyong to join Toulouse Olympique in the Championship.

References

External links

Toulouse Olympique profile
South Sydney Rabbitohs profile

2017 RLWC profile

1991 births
Living people
Australian people of Italian descent
Australian rugby league players
Italy national rugby league team players
North Sydney Bears NSW Cup players
Northern Suburbs Blues players
Rugby league centres
Rugby league players from Newcastle, New South Wales
Rugby league wingers
Wyong Roos players